A protest (also called a demonstration, remonstration or remonstrance or a maree richo) is a public expression of objection, disapproval or dissent towards an idea or action, typically a political one. 
Protests can be thought of as  acts of cooperation in which numerous people cooperate by attending, and share the potential costs and risks of doing so. 
Protests can take many different forms, from individual statements to mass demonstrations. Protesters may organize a protest as a way of publicly making their opinions heard in an attempt to influence public opinion or government policy, or they may undertake direct action in an attempt to enact desired changes themselves. Where protests are part of a systematic and peaceful nonviolent campaign to achieve a particular objective, and involve the use of pressure as well as persuasion, they go beyond mere protest and may be better described as a type of protest called civil resistance or nonviolent resistance.

Various forms of self-expression and protest are sometimes restricted by governmental policy (such as the requirement of protest permits), economic circumstances, religious orthodoxy, social structures, or media monopoly. One state reaction to protests is the use of riot police. Observers have noted an increased militarization of protest policing in many countries, with police deploying armored vehicles and snipers against protesters. When such restrictions occur, protests may assume the form of open civil disobedience, more subtle forms of resistance against the restrictions, or may spill over into other areas such as culture and emigration.

A protest itself may at times be the subject of a counter-protest. In such cases, counter-protesters demonstrate their support for the person, policy, action, etc. that is the subject of the original protest. Protesters and counter-protesters can sometimes violently clash. One study found that nonviolent activism during the civil rights movement in the United States tended to produce favorable media coverage and changes in public opinion focusing on the issues organizers were raising, but violent protests tended to generate unfavorable media coverage that generated public desire to restore law and order.

Historical examples

Unaddressed protests may grow and widen into civil resistance, dissent, activism, riots, insurgency, revolts, and political or social revolution. Some examples of protests include:
 Northern Europe in the early 16th century (Protestant Reformation)
 North America in the 1770s (American Revolution)
 Pennsylvania Mutiny of 1783, an anti-government protest by several hundred soldiers of the Continental Army 
 France in 1789 (French Revolution)
 Haiti in 1803 (Haitian Revolution), the first successful black revolution against slavery
 The Haymarket affair in 1886, a violent labor protest led by the Anarchist Movement
 New York shirtwaist strike of 1909
 Mohandas Gandhi's 1930 Salt March to protest the colonial salt tax in India
 1963 March on Washington for Jobs and Freedom, a key moment in the Civil rights movement
 Selma to Montgomery marches of 1965, part of the Civil Rights Movement
 Protests against the Vietnam War
 Mexico 68
 The Occupation of the Old Student House in Helsinki, Finland in 1968
 The Stonewall riots in 1969, protesting the treatment of homosexuals in New York City
 The People Power Revolution in the Philippines
 Thai military personnel, police and others, shooting at peaceful protesters at the Thammasat University. 
 The Solidarity (Polish trade union) Movement's protests against Soviet Communism in Poland from 1980 to 1989.
 The Tiananmen Square protests of 1989
 The Alexanderplatz demonstrations from November 4–9, 1989, which culminated in the Fall of the Berlin Wall
 The many ACT-UP AIDS protests of the late 1980s and early 1990s
Japanese Canadians Protest of their Dispossession
 The Seattle WTO Ministerial Conference of 1999 protest activity against the World Trade Organization
 Anti-globalization protests in Prague in 2000
 Anti-globalization protests in Genoa from 18 to 22 July 2001
 15 February 2003 Iraq War Protest
 The First Intifada and Second Intifada in Palestine
 Anti-nuclear protests
 2007 Bersih rally
 2010 Thai political protests
 2011 Iranian protests
 Arab Spring protests
 Impact of the Arab Spring
 Occupy Wall Street protests
 Bersih Malaysia protests
 Gezi Park protests in 2013 in Turkey
 June 2013 Egyptian protests
 Euromaidan protests in Ukraine, November 2013–February 2014
 Black Lives Matter-led protests on July 13, 2013
 Sunflower Student Movement
 Add the Words gay and transgender rights protests in Idaho in 2014.
 2014 Hong Kong Umbrella Movement
 2016 South Korean protests
 2017 Jallikattu protests
 2017–2019 Romanian protests 
 Dakota Access Pipeline protests
 2018 Tommy Robinson protests 
 2018 Sadiq Khan protests
 March for Our Lives protests
 2018 Armenian Velvet Revolution
 2018-2019 Sudanese protests
 2018–2020 Serbian protests
 2019 Venezuelan protests
 2019 Indonesian protests
 2019 Bolivian protests
 2019–20 Hong Kong protests
 Citizenship Amendment Act protests
 2019–20 Lebanese protests
2019–2021 Iraqi protests
 George Floyd protests
 2020–21 Belarusian protests
 Protests over responses to the COVID-19 pandemic
 COVID-19 protests and riots in Serbia
 2020 Thai protests
 2020–2021 United States election protests
 Mahsa Amini protests

Forms

A protest can take many forms.
Willingness to participate is influenced by individuals' ties within social networks.  Social connections can affect both the spread of factual information about a protest and social pressures on participants. 
Willing to participate will also vary depending on the type of protest. 
Likelihood that someone will respond to a protest is also affected by group identification, and by the types of tactics involved.

The Dynamics of Collective Action project and the Global Nonviolent Action Database are two of the leading data collection efforts attempting to capture information about protest events. The Dynamics of Collective Action project considers the repertoire of protest tactics (and their definitions) to include:
 Rally or demonstration: Demonstration, rally, or similar protest, without reference to marching or walking in a picket line or standing in a vigil. Reference to speeches, speakers, singing, or preaching, often verified by the presence of PA sound equipment and sometimes by a platform or stage.  Ordinarily will include worship services, speeches, briefings.
 March: Reference to moving from one location to another; to distinguish from rotating or walking in a circle with picket signs (which is a picket).
 Vigil: Most vigils have banners, placards, or leaflets so that people passing by, despite silence from participants, can be informed about the purpose of the vigil.
 Picket: The modal activity is picketing; there may be references to a picket line, informational picketing, or holding signs; "carrying signs and walking around in a circle". Holding signs, placards, or banners is not the defining criteria; rather, it is holding or carrying those items and walking a circular route, a phrase sometimes surprisingly found in the permit application.
 Civil disobedience: Explicit protest that involves deliberately breaking laws deemed unjust in order to protest them; crossing barricades, prohibited use of segregated facilities (such as lunch-counters or restrooms), voter registration drives (to earn non-eligible people the right to vote), or tying up phone lines.
 Ceremony: These celebrate or protest status transitions ranging from birth and death dates of individuals, organizations or nations; seasons; re-enlistment or commissioning of military personnel; or to anniversaries of any of the above. These are sometimes referenced by presenting flowers or wreaths commemorating, dedicating, or celebrating status transitions or their anniversary; e.g., an annual merchant marine memorial service, celebrating Hanukkah or Easter, or celebrating the birthday of Martin Luther King Jr.
 Dramaturgical demonstration
 Motorcade: Vehicular procession (electoral campaigns or other issues)
 Information distribution: Tabling/petition gathering, lobbying, letter-writing campaigns, or teach-ins.
 Symbolic display: e.g., a menorah or creche scene, graffiti, cross burning, sign, or standing display.
 Attack by collective group (not-one-on-one assault, crime, rape): Motivation for attack is the "other group's identity", as in gay-bashing or lynching. Can also include verbal attacks or threats. (See hate crime)
 Riot, melee, mob violence: Large-scale (50+), use of violence by instigators against persons, property, police, or buildings separately or in combination, lasting several hours.
 Strike, slow down, sick-ins, and employee work protest of any kind: Regular air strike through failure of negotiations or wildcat air strike. (Make note if a wildcat strike.)
 Boycott: Organized refusal to buy or use a product or service. Examples: rent strikes, Montgomery bus boycotts
 Press conference: Only if specifically named as such in report, and must be the predominant activity form. Could involve disclosure of information to "educate the public" or influence various decision-makers.
 Organization formation announcement or meeting announcement: Meeting or press conference to announce the formation of a new organization.
 Conflict, attack or clash (no instigator): This includes any boundary conflict in which no instigator can be identified, i.e. Black/white conflicts, abortion/anti-abortion conflicts.
Prayer Walk: A prayer walk is an activity that consists of walking and praying at the same time. 
 Lawsuit: Legal maneuver by social movement organization or group.
Peopleless Protest: Simultaneous online and offline protests involving physical representations of protesters in public spaces that are subsequently assembled online. Developed in Europe during the COVID-19 pandemic.

The Global Nonviolent Action Database uses Gene Sharp's classification of 198 methods of nonviolent action. There is considerable overlap with the Dynamics of Collective Action repertoire, although the GNA repertoire includes more specific tactics. Together, the two projects help define tactics available to protesters and document instances of their use.

Typology

Thomas Ratliff and Lori Hall have devised a typology of six broad activity categories of the protest activities described in the Dynamics of Collective Action project.
 Literal, symbolic, aesthetic and sensory - Artistic, dramaturgical, and symbolic displays (street theater, dancing, etc.) including use of images, objects, graphic art, musical performances, or vocal/auditory exhibitions (speech-making, chanting, etc.). May also include tactile exchanges of information (petitions, leaflets, etc.) and the destruction of objects of symbolic or political value. Highly visible and most diverse category of activity; impacts on society (police response, media focus, impact on potential allies, etc.) often are underestimated.
 Solemnity and the sacred – Vigils, prayer, or rallies, in the form of religious service, candlelight vigils, cross or coffin bearing etc. All directly related to the Durkheimian "sacred", or some form of religious or spiritual practice, belief, or ideology. Events where sacred activity is the primary focus are rarely responded to by police with force or presence. Solemnity usually provides a distinct quietness or stillness, changing the energy, description, and interpretation of such events.
 Institutional and conventional – Institutionalized activity or activity highly dependent on formal political processes and social institutions (press conferences, lawsuits, lobbying, etc.). Often conflated with non-confrontational and nonviolent activities in research as the other or reference category. More acceptable because it operates, to some degree, within the system. Historically contentious issue in regard to the practice of protest due to this integration within the system.
 Movement in space – Marches or parades (processional activities) from one spatio-temporal location to another, with beginning or ending places sometimes chosen for symbolic reasons. Picket lines often used in labor strikes but can be used by non-labor actors but the key differences between picket and processionals are the distance of movement. Events that take the form of a procession are logistically much more difficult to police (even if it is for the safety of protesters). Marches are some of the largest events in this period.
 Civil disobedience – Withholding obligations, sit-ins, blockades, shop-ins, occupations, bannering, "camping", etc., are all specific activities which constitute the tactical form of civil disobedience. In some way, these activities directly or technically break the law. Usually given most attention by researchers, media, and authorities. Often conflated with violence and threats because of direct action and confrontational nature, but should serve as a distinct category of action (both in the context of tactical and strategic planning and in the control of activity).
 Collective violence and threats – Collective violence such as pushing, shoving, hitting, punching, damaging property, throwing objects, verbal threats, etc., is usually committed by a relative few out of many protesters (even tens of thousands). It is rare in occurrence and rarely condoned by the public or onlookers (particularly the media). Usually met with equivalent or overwhelming force in response by authorities.

Some forms of direct action listed in this article are also public demonstrations or rallies.
 Protest march, a historically and geographically common form of nonviolent action by groups of people.
 Picketing, a form of protest in which people congregate outside a place of work or location where an event is taking place. Often, this is done in an attempt to dissuade others from going in ("crossing the picket line"), but it can also be done to draw public attention to a cause.
 Street protesters demonstrate in areas with high visibility, often employing handmade placards such as sandwich boards or picket signs in order to maximize exposure and interaction with the public.
 Lockdowns and lock-ons are a way to stop movement of an object like a structure or tree, and to thwart the removal of actual protesters from the location. Users employ various chains, locks and even the sleeping dragon for impairment of those trying to remove them with a matrix of composted materials.
 Die-ins are a form of protest where participants simulate being dead (with varying degrees of realism). In the simplest form of a die-in, protesters simply lie down on the ground and pretend to be dead, sometimes covering themselves with signs or banners. Much of the effectiveness depends on the posture of the protesters, for when not properly executed, the protest might look more like a "sleep-in". For added realism, simulated wounds are sometimes painted on the bodies, or bandages, usually made to appear bloody, are used.
 Protest song is a song which protests perceived problems in society. Every major movement in Western history has been accompanied by its own collection of protest songs, from slave emancipation to women's suffrage, the labor movement, civil rights, the anti-war movement, the feminist movement, the environmental movement. Over time, the songs have come to protest more abstract, moral issues, such as injustice, racial discrimination, the morality of war in general (as opposed to purely protesting individual wars), globalization, inflation, social inequalities, and incarceration.
 Radical cheerleading. The idea is to ironically re-appropriate the aesthetics of cheerleading, for example by changing the chants to promote feminism and left-wing causes. Many radical cheerleaders (some of whom are male, transgender or non-gender identified) are in appearance far from the stereotypical image of a cheerleader.
 Critical Mass bike rides have been perceived as protest activities. A 2006 New Yorker article described Critical Mass' activity in New York City as "monthly political-protest rides", and characterized Critical Mass as a part of a social movement; the U.K. e-zine Urban75, which advertises as well as publishes photographs of the Critical Mass event in London, describes this as "the monthly protest by cyclists reclaiming the streets of London". However, Critical Mass participants have insisted that these events should be viewed as "celebrations" and spontaneous gatherings, not as protests or organized demonstrations. This stance allows Critical Mass to argue a legal position that its events can occur without advance notification of local police.
 Toyi-toyi is a Southern African dance originally from Zimbabwe that became famous for its use in political protests in the apartheid-era South Africa. See Protest in South Africa.

Written demonstration
Written evidence of political or economic power, or democratic justification may also be a way of protesting.
 Petitions
 Letters (to show political power by the volume of letters): Used by some letter writing campaigns, especially those with a form letter that supporters are given to sign

Civil disobedience demonstrations

Any protest could be civil disobedience if a "ruling authority" says so, but the following are usually civil disobedience demonstrations:
 Public nudity or topfree (to protest indecency laws or as a publicity stunt for another protest such as a war protest) or animal mistreatment (e.g. PETA's campaign against fur). See also Nudity and protest.
 Sit-in
 Photobombing – disrupting an event being broadcast live
 Raasta roko – people blocking auto traffic with their bodies
 Silent protest
 Lebenslaute

As a residence
 Peace camp
 Formation of a tent city
 Camp for Climate Action

Destructive

 Vandalism – Smashing windows or spraying graffiti is used as a form of riot, and is sometimes employed by black bloc groups.
 Riot – Protests or attempts to end protests sometimes lead to rioting.
 Looting – stealing goods from establishments or businesses (takes place during riots)
 Self-immolation
 Suicide
 Hunger strike
 Bombing

Non-destructive
 Silent protest – protests or parades in which participants are nonviolent and usually silent in an attempt to avoid violent confrontation with military or police forces. This tactic was effectively used during the Arab Spring in cities such as Tehran and Cairo.

Direct action
 Civil resistance
 Nonviolent resistance
 Occupation
 Public Shaming

Against a government

 Tax resistance
 Conscientious objector
 Flag desecration

Against a military shipment
 Port Militarization Resistance – protests which attempt to prevent military cargo shipments

Against a planning application or development

 NIMBY ("not in my backyard") – protest by residents of an area against a development in the area they see as undesirable

By government employees

 Bully pulpit
 Judicial activism
 Filibuster

Job action

 Strike action
 Walkout
 Work-to-rule

In sports
	In modern times sports protests have become increasingly significant, causing more people to take notice. Sporting protests can be about any number of things ranging from racial justice to political wrongdoings. Some of the most prominent sports figures being Tommie Smith, Jhon Carlos, Muhammad Ali, Jackie Robison, Colin Kaepernick and Billie Jean King have all pushed forward change by this method of protest. However, the majority of people don't believe sports and politics belong together, saying,“ Most of us who love sports want to forget about politics when we watch games.” Nevertheless, this statement can still be controversial since others believe that sports athletes should use their platform and wealth to encourage change. Either way protesting in sports is an important form of protest that has gotten significant media attention and has caused significant change throughout modern times.
During a sporting event, under certain circumstances, one side may choose to play a game "under protest", usually when they feel the rules are not being correctly applied. The event continues as normal, and the events causing the protest are reviewed after the fact. If the protest is held to be valid, then the results of the event are changed. Each sport has different rules for protests.

By management
 Lockout

By tenants
 Rent strike

By consumers
 Boycott
 Consumer Court

Information
 Informative letters, letter writing campaigns, letters to the editor
 Teach-in
 Zine
 Soap-boxing

Civil disobedience to censorship
 Samizdat (distributing censored materials)
 Protest graffiti

By Internet and social networking
Blogging and social networking have become effective tools to register protest and grievances. Protests can express views or news, and use viral networking to reach out to thousands of people. With protests on the rise from the U.S. election season of 2016 going into 2017, protesters became aware that using their social media during a protest could make them an easier target for government surveillance.

Literature, art and culture
 Culture jamming

Against religious or ideological institutions
 Recusancy
 Book burning

Economic effects against companies

A study of 342 US protests covered by The New York Times newspaper from 1962 to 1990 showed that such public activities usually affected the company's publicly traded stock price. The most intriguing aspect of the study's findings revealed that the amount of media coverage the event received was of the most importance to this study. Stock prices fell an average of one-tenth of a percent for every paragraph printed about the event.

See also

 Activist Wisdom, a book about protesters in Australia
 Anti-globalization movement
 Fare strike
 First Amendment to the United States Constitution 
 Coup d'état
 Revolution
 Riot
 People power
 Two Minutes Hate              
 Struggle session
 Emmanuel Goldstein
 Mass mobilization
 Burning of the Papal Bull by Martin Luther, during Protestant reformation and the Counter-Reformation of the Catholic Church in Western and Central Europe, Mainland Europe, Europe              
 1992 Los Angeles riots
 Gandhigiri
 "I Protest"
 List of uprisings led by women
 Protest art
 Public Library Advocacy
 Right to protest
 Satyagraha
 Social criticism
 Tactical frivolity

References

 
Activism by type
Civil disobedience